Front Page Sports: Football Pro '97 is a video game developed by Synergistic Software and published by Sierra for Windows in 1996.

Publication
The fifth version of the Front Page Sports Football series was the first for Windows 95. The game featured running back Barry Sanders as its cover athlete. It was immediately succeeded by Football Pro '98, of which quarterback Dan Marino was the cover athlete.

Reception

Kevin Mical hailed the game as "more than just a run-of-the-mill football game for the PC" in GameSpot. He was enthusiastic about the game's additional options, particularly the ability to take on the role of the general manager or coach as well as any player. He also found the coaching more user-friendly and the multiplayer features improved, though he commented that the player animation is choppy. A reviewer for Next Generation, in contrast, summarized it as "three or four year old DOS code clumsily retrofitted into a Windows 95 product." He noted that the game's strong points - its "hardcore football simulation", numerous customization options, and player stats - were essentially inherited from its DOS-based predecessors, meaning anyone who already had the previous year's installment had no reason to upgrade. He also complained of the windowed display, "mushy" control, and numerous bugs.

References

1996 video games
American football video games
Multiplayer and single-player video games
Sierra Entertainment games
Synergistic Software games
Video games developed in the United States
Windows games
Windows-only games